Drainage system may refer to:

Drainage system (geomorphology), patterns formed by streams, rivers, and lakes in a drainage basin
Drainage system (agriculture), a system by which water is drained on or in the soil to enhance production
Sustainable drainage system, designed to reduce the potential impact of development

See also
 Drainage
 Storm drain
 Tile drainage
 Watertable control